The bear as heraldic charge is not as widely used as the lion, boar or other beasts.

In England it occurs mostly in canting arms, e.g. in the familial coats of arms of Barnard, Baring, Barnes, Bearsley, etc. In British and Irish heraldry, a bear's head is usually muzzled (reflecting the lack of wild bears in those islands), and is more commonly used as a charge than the whole beast. In England and Ireland, the bear's head traditionally includes the neck, while in Scottish heraldry bear heads are cut off close behind the ears.
 
The bear in the coat of arms of Berlin is also used cantingly, and appears in representations of the Berlin coats of arms in the early modern period (used alongside the Prussian and Brandenburg eagles until the early 20th century).  Also canting, but associated with a legendary false etymology of the city's name, is the bear in the coat of arms of Berne.

At the Battle of Las Navas de Tolosa in 1212 between Alfonso VIII of Castile and the Almohads, the council of Madrid sent a detachment in support of the Christian king. According to chronicles of the time, these troops carried a flag or banner which identified them: a statant bear on a silver field.

The bear is also used in arms representing Saint Gall, based on a legend of the saint involving a bear. 
This is the origin of the bear in  the coat of arms in the Abbey of Saint Gall and of Appenzell. The bear of Appenzell is represented pizzled; omission of the bear's penis from the coat of arms of Appenzell was seen as a grave insult, and was notoriously forgotten by the printer of a calendar printed in Saint Gallen 1579, which brought Appenzell to the brink of war with Saint Gallen.

The saddled bear of Saint Corbinian's legend is the heraldic symbol of Freising, Bavaria, and the Diocese of Munich and Freising. Pope Benedict XVI, former archbishop of Munich, also applied it in his Papal Arms.

In 1666 a polar bear on a blue field was added to the greater/royal arms of the king of Denmark to represent Greenland. It has since then been adopted by Greenland itself as its coat of arms, with the current version having been adopted in 1989. The Greenlandic version bucks European heraldic tradition in favour of Inuit custom by having the bear's left arm raised rather than the right; when used in Denmark the right is raised. It is officially blazoned Azure, a polar bear rampant argent and as such neither version contradicts the other.

Modern civic and provincial heraldry

A demi bear appears in the crest of Lawson in Canada. A grizzly bear, with wings, appears as a supporter in the bearings of Norris, also in Canada. Canada has armigers with polar bears in their bearings. Chimerical half-bear, half-ravens appear as supporters of the Canadian Heraldic Authority.

Civic heraldry in Warwickshire abounds in bears. A bear is also used, cantingly, in the arms of the Berwick-upon-Tweed Borough Council.

Russian bears (brown bears) and polar bears appear on the coats of arms and flags of numerous Russian federal subjects and cities, including the Republic of Karelia, the Mari El Republic, the city of Veliky Novgorod and Novgorod Oblast, the Yaroslavl Oblast, Khabarovsk Krai, Perm Krai, Zheleznogorsk, Baltasinsky District, the Chukotka Autonomous Okrug, and the Yamalo-Nenets Autonomous Okrug.

The Finnish region of Satakunta and the corresponding historical province feature a crowned sword-wielding bear on their coats of arms. Pori, Satakunta's capital, features a crowned bear's head on its arms.

The coat of arms of Madrid depicts a bear reaching up into a madroño or strawberry tree (Arbutus unedo) to eat some of its fruit.

The coat of arms of Carpathian Ukraine, which features a red bear, is used as the coat of arms of the Ukrainian Zakarpattia Oblast; it was formerly used by Subcarpathian Ruthenia, the oblast's predecessor within Czechoslovakia.

A black bear appears on the coat of arms (and flag) of Przemyśl, Poland.

A black bear with silver claws and a collar appears on the coat of arms of Samogitia, a cultural region of Lithuania, and the coat of arms of Šiauliai, the capital city of Lithuanian Šiauliai County.

See also
Bear in mythology
Russian Bear
Buddy bears

Notes
a.The bear was the heraldic animal of the seal and coat of arms of Bern from the 1220s, attested shortly after its foundation by Berchtold V, Duke of Zähringen in 1191. Swiss chronicles are unanimous in deriving the name of the city from the name of the animal; modern historiography has long assumed, however, that the city had been named for Verona, until the discovery of the Bern zinc tablet in the 1980s, which suggested that the toponymy is of Celtic origin.

References

Heraldic beasts
Bears
Bears in art
Bears in popular culture